Powelliphanta spedeni lateumbilicata, known as one of the amber snails, is a subspecies of large, carnivorous land snail, a terrestrial pulmonate gastropod mollusc in the family Rhytididae.

Conservation status
Powelliphanta spedeni lateumbilicata is classified by the New Zealand Department of Conservation as being Range Restricted.

References
 Powell A. W. B., New Zealand Mollusca, William Collins Publishers Ltd, Auckland, New Zealand 1979 
 New Zealand Department of Conservation Threatened Species Classification

Gastropods of New Zealand
Powelliphanta
Taxa named by Arthur William Baden Powell
Endemic fauna of New Zealand
Endemic molluscs of New Zealand